Alexander Everett Moffat (born March 25, 1982) is an American actor, comedian, and singer. Moffat is best known for his tenure as a cast member on the NBC sketch comedy series Saturday Night Live, where he debuted as a featured player during the show's 42nd season in 2016, alongside Mikey Day and Melissa Villaseñor. After two seasons as featured players, all three became repertory cast members in 2018, beginning with the show's 44th season. Moffat left SNL in 2022, after six years as a cast member.

Early life
Moffat was born and raised in Chicago, Illinois, and graduated from North Shore Country Day School in 2000. Afterwards he attended Denison University, graduating in 2004.

Career
Moffat started his comedy career as a Chicago-based improviser and featured performer at The Second City, ImprovOlympic, Annoyance Theatre, and Zanies Comedy Club. In 2015, Moffat co-starred alongside John Ashton in the indie-drama Uncle John, and in 2016, he joined the cast of Saturday Night Live.

Saturday Night Live
Moffat made his debut on Saturday Night Live on the October 1, 2016 episode hosted by Margot Robbie with musical guest The Weeknd, alongside Mikey Day and Melissa Villaseñor. Moffat became a repertory cast member in 2018, beginning with Season 44. On the December 19, 2020 episode, Moffat appeared in the cold open playing President-elect Joe Biden, taking over the role from Jim Carrey. He left the show at the end of the show's 47th season in 2022, following six years as a cast member.

Celebrity impressions on Saturday Night Live

 Casey Affleck 
 David Beckham
 Joe Biden
 Richard Branson
 Billy Bush
 Tucker Carlson
 Anderson Cooper
 Bill Cowher
 Willem Dafoe
 Mark Davis
 Steve Doocy
 Ross Duffer
 Al Franken
 Hugh Grant
 Kelsey Grammer
 Chuck Grassley
 Tom Green
 Kit Harington
 Chris Harrison
 Chris Hemsworth
 Phil Jackson
 Ernie Johnson Jr.
 Egils Levits
 Arie Luyendyk Jr.
 Paul Manafort
 Marc Maron
 Conor McGregor
 Gavin Newsom
 Beto O'Rourke
 Enrique Peña Nieto
 Joe Scarborough
 Adam Schiff
 Chuck Schumer
 Brady Skjei
 Eric Trump
 Prince William 
 Glenn Youngkin
 Geoff Zakarian
 Mark Zuckerberg

Recurring characters on Saturday Night Live
 The Guy Who Just Bought a Boat, a preppy snob who gives dating advice and makes offhand comments about how horrible his sexual prowess is (according to the season 43 episode hosted by Ryan Gosling, he has a cousin (played by Gosling) known as The Guy who Just Joined Soho House, who acts similar to him, and in season 45 Ryan Reynolds played his frat brother, The Guy Who Knows the Owner, in a cameo appearance).

Personal life
He is married to Caroline Rau, and their first child, daughter Everett, was born in January 2021.

Filmography

Film

Television

Podcasts

References

External links

1982 births
Living people
21st-century American comedians
21st-century American male actors
American impressionists (entertainers)
American male comedians
American male television actors
American sketch comedians
American stand-up comedians
Comedians from Illinois
Denison University alumni
Male actors from Illinois